Soeiro is Portuguese given name and surname.

Notable people with the given name include:

Soeiro Raimundes de Riba de Vizela (d. 1220), Portuguese nobleman
Soeiro Pereira Gomes (1909–1949), Portuguese writer

Notable people with the surname include:

Edite Soeiro (1934–2009), Portuguese journalist 
Ernesto Soeiro (born 1961), Portuguese footballer
José Soeiro (born 1984), Portuguese sociologist and politician
Manuel Soeiro (1909–1977), Portuguese footballer

See also
Suero (given name)

Portuguese given names
Surnames of Portuguese origin